Flight 771 may refer to a number of aviation accidents:

Alitalia Flight 771, crashed on 7 July 1962 in India 
Gulf Air Flight 771, exploded on 23 September 1983 in the United Arab Emirates 
Afriqiyah Airways Flight 771, crashed on 12 May 2010 in Libya 

0771